Wei Yongli (Chinese: 韦永丽; born October 11, 1991 in Baise, Guangxi) is a Chinese sprinter.  She competed in the 100 metres competition at the 2012 Summer Olympics; she ran Round 1 in 11.48 seconds, which did not qualify her for the semifinals.

She was part of the Chinese 4 x 100 m relay team that reached the final at the 2020 Olympics.

Competition record

1Disqualified in the final

Personal bests
Outdoor
100 metres – 10.99 (+1.2 m/s) (La Chaux-de-Fonds 2018)
200 metres – 22.97 (+1.6 m/s) (Madrid 2018)
Indoor
60 metres – 7.17 (Nanjing 2016) NR
200 metres – 23.61 (Beijing 2014)

References

1991 births
Living people
Chinese female sprinters
Olympic athletes of China
Athletes (track and field) at the 2012 Summer Olympics
Athletes (track and field) at the 2016 Summer Olympics
Runners from Guangxi
Asian Games gold medalists for China
Asian Games silver medalists for China
Asian Games bronze medalists for China
Asian Games medalists in athletics (track and field)
Athletes (track and field) at the 2014 Asian Games
Athletes (track and field) at the 2018 Asian Games
World Athletics Championships athletes for China
Medalists at the 2014 Asian Games
Medalists at the 2018 Asian Games
People from Baise
Athletes (track and field) at the 2020 Summer Olympics
Olympic female sprinters
21st-century Chinese women